The Church of Saint Panteleimon (Naós Agíou Panteleímona) is a late Byzantine church Built in the 14th century in Thessaloniki, Greece. Because of its well-preserved Byzantine architecture and its testimony to the importance of Thessaloniki to early and medieval Christianity, the church was inscribed on the UNESCO World Heritage List in 1988 along with several other Paleochristian and Byzantine monuments of Thessaloniki.

History 
The church lies in the eastern part of the old city, near the Tomb of Galerius (the "Rotunda"), at the intersection of Iasonidou and Arrianou streets. Its current dedication to Saint Panteleimon was given to the church after the end of Ottoman rule in 1912, and its original dedication is therefore disputed. In Ottoman times, it was converted into a mosque in 1548 and became known as İshakiye Camii ("Mosque of Ishak [Isaac]"), which in the prevailing scholarly interpretation points to an identification with the late Byzantine Monastery of the Virgin Peribleptos, also known as the Monastery of Kyr Isaac after its founder Jacob, who was the city's metropolitan bishop in 1295–1315 and became a monk with the monastic name of Isaac. A counter-argument however supports the theory that the present church is unrelated to the Peribleptos Monastery, and that it was converted into a mosque ca. 1500, when the city's kadı (judge), was Ishak Çelebi, whom the mosque was named after. However, the church's architecture and decoration, which date to the late 13th/early 14th centuries, appear to support the former view.

The church is of the tetrastyle cross-in-square type, with a narthex and a (now destroyed) ambulatory that is connected to two chapels (still extant). Very few of the building's original wall paintings survive. Ottoman remains include the base of the demolished minaret and a marble fountain.

See also
History of Roman and Byzantine domes

References

Sources

External links
 

Byzantine church buildings in Thessaloniki
14th-century churches in Greece
World Heritage Sites in Greece
Mosques converted from churches in Ottoman Greece
Former mosques in Greece
Church buildings with domes
14th-century establishments in the Byzantine Empire